Sam A is a village in the northeastern New Territories of Hong Kong, named after the bay of Sam A Wan.

Administration
Sam A is a recognized village under the New Territories Small House Policy.

History
The Tsang of Sam A have the same ancestor with the Tsang of Ma Tseuk Leng Sheung and Lai Chi Wo.

In its heyday in the 1950s and 1960s, there were more than 200 residents in the village, but at the end of the 1960s most of the men left the village to seek employment in the United Kingdom and the Netherlands.

Sam A is one of the seven Hakka villages of the Hing Chun Yeuk, which comprises Kop Tong, Lai Chi Wo, Mui Tsz Lam, Ngau Shi Wu, Sam A, Siu Tan, and So Lo Pun.

Features
Today, the Tsang ancestral hall and the abandoned three-village school still stand, but there is little life here on a week-day. On week-ends, however, some Tsang clan members return to their ancestral village to run a couple of stores that offer food and lodgings for the ever increasing number of visitors. Still, even today, Sam A is still only accessible by boat or on foot.

See also
 List of villages in Hong Kong
 Lai Chi Wo
 Sha Tau Kok Public Pier
 Double Haven

References

External links

 Delineation of area of existing village Sam A (Sha Tau Kok) for election of resident representative (2019 to 2022)
 

Villages in North District, Hong Kong